Anything Goes is the cast recording of the 1989 London production of the Cole Porter musical of the same name.

Principal artists
 Elaine Paige
 Howard McGillin
 Bernard Cribbins
 Kathryn Evans

Track listing
 Overture
 I Get A Kick Out Of You
 There's No Cure Like Travel
 Bon Voyage
 Last Seating For Supper
 You're The Top
 Easy To Love
 Easy To Love (Reprise)
 Crew Song
 There'll Always Be A Lady Fair
 Friendship
 It's De Lovely
 Anything Goes
 Interlude
 Public Enemy Number One
 Blow Gabriel Blow
 Goodbye Little Dream Goodbye
 Be Like The Bluebird
 All Through The Night
 Gypsy In Me
 Buddie Beware
 Finale: I Get A Kick Out Of You

Singles
Elaine Paige released the title track as a single with 'I get a kick out of you' as the B side.

External links
 First Night Records

Cast recordings
1989 soundtrack albums
Theatre soundtracks